Love Me Not ("Love and Such Is Not Necessary") is a 2006 South Korean romance film directed by Lee Cheol-ha and starring Moon Geun-young and Kim Joo-hyuk.

It is based on the 2002 TBS Japanese drama , starring Ryōko Hirosue. The 2013 South Korean television series That Winter, the Wind Blows is also based on the same storyline.

Plot
Julian (Kim Joohyuk) has lived off with the money he lures from his rich female customers. But now he faces usurious debts from a hasty expansion of his business, and he will be killed unless he clears the debt in one month. The only way to save himself is to pretend to be the long-lost brother of an heiress and kill her to get her huge fortune. Min (Moon Geun-young), the blind cold-hearted heiress likes Julian, she slowly opens herself to him, and he, too, falls for her. But Julian has to pay his creditor and what makes it worse for him is that the illness that took Min's eyesight relapsed, threatening her life. This story takes a terrible turn when Julian becomes guilty, and pained with guilt.

Reception
The film had 548,998 admissions and earned .

Awards and nominations
2007 Grand Bell Awards
 Nomination – Best Actress - Moon Geun-young
 Nomination – Best Art Direction - Jang Jae-jin
 Nomination – Best Costume Design - Chae Kyung-hwa

Soundtrack
 Sunshine (Orgol Version)
 Julian
 Adonis Club I
 Memoris
 Love Theme
 I Believe In You (庭園)
 Min
 Sunshine (Clarinet Version)
 Julian's Tears
 Tell Me The Truth
 Your Picture
 Secret
 Last Dinner
 Adonis Club Ii
 Destiny
 The Shadow Of Love
 Never End
 Sunshine (sung by BoA)
 (Bonus Track) He Says
 (Bonus Track) She Says
 (Bonus Track) Sunshine (Instrumental)

References

External links
 
 
 

2006 films
2006 romantic drama films
Films about blind people
Films based on television series
2000s Korean-language films
Films directed by Lee Cheol-ha
South Korean romantic drama films
Ai Nante Irane Yo, Natsu
2000s South Korean films